Szymon Walków and Jan Zieliński were the defending champions but chose not to defend their title.

Marcelo Demoliner and Jan-Lennard Struff won the title after defeating Roman Jebavý and Adam Pavlásek 6–4, 7–5 in the final.

Seeds

Draw

References

External links
 Main draw

Brawo Open - Doubles
2022 Doubles